Lautrec is a 1998 French biographical film about the painter Henri de Toulouse-Lautrec. The film focuses on his love affair with painter Suzanne Valadon.

Cast 
 Régis Royer - Henri de Toulouse-Lautrec
 Elsa Zylberstein - Suzanne Valadon
 Anémone - Comtesse Adèle de Toulouse-Lautrec
 Claude Rich - Comte Alphonse de Toulouse-Lautrec
  - La Goulue
  - Hélène
 Alex Pandev - La Grande Charlotte 
 Amanda Rubinstein - Mireille
  - Rose la Rouge
 Jean-Marie Bigard - Aristide Bruant
 Karel Vingerhoets - Vincent van Gogh

References

External links 

1990s biographical drama films
French biographical drama films
Biographical films about painters
Films set in Paris
Films shot in Paris
Films set in the 1890s
Cultural depictions of Henri de Toulouse-Lautrec
Cultural depictions of Vincent van Gogh
1990s French-language films
1990s French films